The 2004 Pepsi 300 was the seventh stock car race of the 2004 NASCAR Busch Series and the fourth iteration of the event. The race was held on Saturday, April 10, 2004, in Gladeville, Tennessee at Nashville Superspeedway, a  permanent D-shaped racetrack. The race took its scheduled 225 laps to complete. With two laps to go, the four leaders in the race, Kyle Busch, Clint Bowyer, Johnny Benson Jr., and Robby Gordon were involved in an accident when Bowyer tapped Busch exiting turn two. At the last second before the caution, then sixth-place driver, Michael Waltrip Racing driver Michael Waltrip, would pass then fifth-place driver, Brewco Motorsports driver Johnny Sauter, to take the lead when the caution was thrown by NASCAR. NASCAR would hand Waltrip the victory, and Sauter would earn second place. The win was Waltrip's 11th and to date, final career NASCAR Busch Series win and his only win of the season. To fill out the podium, Kasey Kahne, driving for Akins Motorsports, would finish third.

Background 

The track was built in 2001 and is currently hosting the Ally 400, a NASCAR Cup Series regular season event, the Tennessee Lottery 250, and the Rackley Roofing 200.

It is a concrete oval track 1 miles (2.145 km) long. Nashville Superspeedway is owned by Speedway Motorsports, which acquired the track's previous owner Dover Motorsports in December 2021. Nashville Superspeedway is the longest concrete oval in NASCAR. Current permanent seating capacity is approximately 25,000, but will reach up to 38,000 for the NASCAR Cup Series event in 2021. Additional portable seats are brought in for some events, and seating capacity can be expanded to 150,000. Infrastructure is in place to expand the facility to include a short track, drag strip, and road course.

Entry list 

 (R) denotes rookie driver.

Practice

First practice 
The first practice session was held on Friday, April 9, at 12:00 PM CST. The session would last for two hours.

Second and final practice 
The final practice session, sometimes referred to as Happy Hour, was held on Friday, April 9, at 6:15 PM CST. The session would last for one hour.

During the session, Martin Truex Jr. would crash along with Jeff Fuller, forcing Truex Jr. to go to a backup car and to start at the rear for the race.

Qualifying 
Qualifying was held on Friday, April 9, at 3:35 PM CST. Each driver would have two laps to set a fastest time; the fastest of the two would count as their official qualifying lap. Positions 1-38 would be decided on time, while positions 39-43 would be based on provisionals. Four spots are awarded by the use of provisionals based on owner's points. The fifth is awarded to a past champion who has not otherwise qualified for the race. If no past champion needs the provisional, the next team in the owner points will be awarded a provisional.

11 drivers would fail to qualify: Shane Wallace, Stan Boyd, Justin Ashburn, Chad Chaffin, Mike Harmon, Greg Sacks, Morgan Shepherd, Jimmy Kitchens, Eddie Beahr, Norm Benning, and Brad Baker.

Full qualifying results

Race results

Standings after the race 

Drivers' Championship standings

Note: Only the first 10 positions are included for the driver standings.

References 

NASCAR races at Nashville Superspeedway
April 2004 sports events in the United States
2004 in sports in Tennessee